Trevor Jones may refer to:

Trevor Jones (Australian footballer) (1918–1985), Australian rules footballer who played with North Melbourne
Trevor Jones (Welsh footballer) (1923–1983), Association footballer for Watford
Trevor Jones (admiral), Australian Deputy Chief of Navy
 Trevor Jones, the birth name of musician and composer John Du Prez (born 1946)
Trevor Jones (composer) (born 1949), South African orchestral film score composer
Trevor Jones (cricketer) (1920–2005), English cricketer for Somerset
Sir Trevor Jones (British politician) (1926–2016), Liverpool Liberal Party politician
Trevor Jones (Canadian politician), member of the Legislative Assembly of Ontario
Trevor Jones (priest) (born 1948), first Archdeacon of Hertford
Trevor Jones (rower) (born 1997), Canadian rower
Trevor M. Jones (born 1942), visiting professor, King's College, University of London, former head of R&D at Wellcome

See also
Trevor Rees-Jones (disambiguation)